Greatest Hits Vol. 1 is a compilation album released by American nu metal band Korn in October 2004. The album features select tracks from their first six studio albums presented in reverse chronological order. There are two previously unreleased songs on the compilation: a cover of Cameo's "Word Up!" and a compilation of all three parts of Pink Floyd's "Another Brick in the Wall" and "Goodbye Cruel World". These were the final songs recorded with their full original lineup, as guitarist Brian Welch, left the band shortly after the album's release in February the following year, until his return in 2013.

Greatest Hits Vol. 1 debuted and peaked at number four on the Billboard 200, achieving a Platinum certification by the RIAA. For unspecified reasons Korn left off three of their hits, "Thoughtless", "No Place to Hide" and "Good God" but included songs "Trash" and "Twist" on the album, though neither were released as singles. The version of "Freak on a Leash" on this album features an extended intro. Because of this, the back cover lists the length of the track as being 4:15 (the length of the album version on Follow the Leader), when the length of the version on this album is 4:27.

Track listing

Bonus DVD: Live at CBGB's (limited edition only)

Personnel
 Jonathan Davis – vocals
 James "Munky" Shaffer – guitar
 Brian "Head" Welch – guitar
 Reginald "Fieldy" Arvizu – bass
 David Silveria – drums

Charts

Weekly charts

Singles

Certifications

References

2004 greatest hits albums
2004 live albums
2004 video albums
Epic Records compilation albums
Epic Records live albums
Epic Records video albums
Korn compilation albums
Live video albums
Immortal Records albums